J.U.S.T.I.C.E. (Just Undeniably Some of The Illest Composers Ever) League is an American record production team composed of producers and instrumentalists from Tampa, Florida. The group is made up of members Erik "Rook" Ortiz, Kevin "Colione" Crowe and Kenneth "Barto" Bartolomei. The group takes their name from the DC Comics superhero team the Justice League. The distinctive producer tag of a J.U.S.T.I.C.E. League production has a female voice echoing the words "Justice League" twice at the beginning of most of their songs. They have a Grammy Award for Best R&B Album for their work on Mary J. Blige's The Breakthrough (2006).

Discography

Studio albums

 J.U.S.T.I.C.E for All (2016)

Mixtapes

 The Grammy Kidsss (2009)

Production credits

2005
Blood Raw featuring T-Pain
Ain't Nothing In My Way
Young Jeezy - Let's Get It: Thug Motivation 101
13. "Don't Get Caught"

Mary J. Blige - The Breakthrough
01. "No One Will Do"

Juelz Santana - What the Game's Been Missing!
02. "Rumble Young Man Rumble"

2006
 J. R. Writer - History In The Making
09. "Riot Pump"

 Shawnna - Block Music
09. "Can't Break Me" (Featuring Buddy Guy)

 Shareefa - Point of No Return
03. "U Told Me"
07. "Butterfly"

 Young Jeezy - The Inspiration
10. "Bury Me a G"

 Young Jeezy
00. "We Jook"

 Tyra B
00. "Baby"

 Plies
00. "100 Percent Real N*gga"

 Acafool
00. "I Look Joel Traudes Good"

 The Game - (Unreleased)
00. "Feels Good (feat. Yummy Bingham)"

2007
 Rico Love - The 5th Element
00. "It's OK"

 J. Holiday - Back of My Lac'
14. "Fallin"
18. "City Boy"
19. "Good for Each Other" (Japan Bonus Track)

 Young Buck -  Buck the World
03. "Buss Yo Head"

 Young Buck
00. "Do It Myself"

 Lil' Scrappy
00. "Addicted To Money"

2008

 2 Pistols - Death Before Dishonor
01. "Intro"
03. "She Got It" (featuring T-Pain & Tay Dizm)
05. "Gettin' Money Mane"
06. "Let's Ride"
07. "Flex 2008"
08. "Eyes Closed" (featuring Young Jeezy)
10. "You Know Me" (featuring Ray J)
11. "We Run It" (featuring Slick Pulla & Blood Raw)
12. "That's My Word" (Intro)
13. "That's My Word" (featuring Trey Songz)

2 Pistols
00. "Blinded"
00. "The Way I Live" (featuring Sean Kingston)

 B.G. - Too Hood 2 Be Hollywood
00. "I Hustle" (featuring Young Jeezy)

Big Kuntry King - My Turn to Eat
04. "We Iz"

 Blood Raw - My Life: The True Testimony
09. "Get Away"

 C-Ride
00. "Hustlin' Pressure" (featuring Kevin Cossom)

 Certified
00. "Turn Off The Lights" (featuring Pleasure P)

 Dave Young
00. "Drinking, Smoking" (featuring 50 Cent)

 Jackie Chain
02. "About Me"

 Rick Ross - Trilla
01. "Intro"
11. "Maybach Music" (featuring Jay-Z)
12. "Billionaire"
13. "Luxury Tax" (featuring Lil Wayne, Trick Daddy and Young Jeezy)

 Rocko - Self-Made
14. "Karma"

 Young A.C.
00. "The Flyest"

 Young Jeezy - The Mixtape Monster
14. "Rock Song"

 Young Jeezy - The Recession
11. "Word Play"
20. "Done It All" (Bonus Track)

2009
 Rick Ross - Deeper Than Rap
02. "Maybach Music 2" (feat. T-Pain, Lil Wayne & Kanye West)
03. "Magnificent" (feat. John Legend)
04. "Yacht Club" (feat. Magazeen)
07. "Rich Off Cocaine" (feat. Avery Storm)

 Maino - If Tomorrow Comes...
08. "Here Comes Trouble"

 Fabolous - Loso's Way
04. "Feel Like I'm Back"

 Ghostface Killah - Ghostdini: The Wizard of Poetry in Emerald City
08. "Guest House" (feat. Fabolous)

 Donnis - Diary Of An Atlanta Brave (Presented by 10.Deep)
02. "Country Cool"
06. "I Am Me" (feat. Colin Munroe)
07. "Here To Stay" (feat. Marsha Ambrosius)
08. "Sexytime"
11. "Ticket To The Moon"

 Wale - Attention: Deficit
16. "Center Of Attention" (Bonus Track)

 Gucci Mane - The State vs. Radric Davis
14. "Volume" (feat. Wooh da Kid)
00. "Atlanta Everything" (feat. Yung Joc, Lil Scrappy, Gorilla Zoe & Lil Boosie)

 B.G. - Too Hood 2 Be Hollywood
17. "I Hustle" (feat. Young Jeezy)

 Lil Scrappy - Tha Grustle
00. "Addicted To Money" (feat. Ludacris)
00. "Addicted To Money (Remix)" (feat. Young Dro, Gorilla Zoe, OJ Da Juiceman, Rick Ross, Ace Hood & Gucci Mane)

Mary J. Blige - Stronger withEach Tear
13. "Brand New" (iTunes Pre-Order Only Bonus Track)

2010
 Lil Wayne - Rebirth
09. "Runnin' (feat. Shanell)"
11. "Knockout (feat. Nicki Minaj)"
00. "Girls Forever"

 Drake
00. "Zone"
00."Baby Come With Me"
00."Paris Morton Music" (Re-release 2019 in Care Package)

 K-os - The Anchorman Mixtape
03. "Faith" feat. Drake

 Carlos Ferragamo
00. "Baby, I'm Back"

 Trina -Amazin'
09. "By Myself"

 Plies  - Goon Affiliated
02. "Rob Myself"
14. "All I Know"
21. "My Girl"

 Bun B - Trill O.G.
02. "Trillionaire" feat. T-Pain
13. "All a Dream" feat. LeToya Luckett
00. "Don't Go"

 Laws - 5:01 Overtime
01. "Overtime"
14. "Flashback"
21. "Runaway"

 Rick Ross - Teflon Don
01. "I'm Not a Star"
04. "Maybach Music III " feat. T.I., Jadakiss & Erykah Badu
10. "Aston Martin Music" feat. Drake & Chrisette Michele

 Big Remo - Entrapment
13. "It's Like That"

 Lloyd Banks - H.F.M. 2 (The Hunger for More)
12. "I Don't Deserve You" (featuring Jeremih)

 Keyshia Cole - Calling All Hearts
02. "Long Way Down"

 Kandi - Kandi Koated
02. "I Want You"

 T.I. - No Mercy
00. "Pledge Allegiance to the Swag" feat. Rick Ross (Bonus Track)

2011
 Ace Hood - Blood, Sweat & Tears
05. "Body 2 Body" (feat. Chris Brown)

Chris Brown - Boy In Detention
08. "Leave the Club" (Feat. Joelle James)

 Tech N9ne - All 6's And 7's
09. "Strangeland"
11. "The Boogieman" (feat. First Degree The D.E. & Stokley Williams of Mint Condition)

 Jay Rock - Follow Me Home
05. "Hood Gone Love It" (feat Kendrick Lamar)
15. "Finest Hour" (feat. Rick Ross & BJ the Chicago Kid)

 Yelawolf - Radioactive
11. "Write Your Name" (feat. Mona Moua)

 Young Jeezy - Thug Motivation 103: Hustlerz Ambition
10. "Trapped" (feat. Jill Scott)
11. "F.A.M.E." (feat. T.I.)

 Mobb Deep - Black Cocaine
07. "Street Lights" (feat. Dion Primo)

 Keyshia Cole - Calling All Hearts

02. "Long Way Down"

2012
 Rick Ross - Rich Forever
08. "Triple Beam Dreams" (feat. Nas)

 MGK - Half Naked & Almost Famous
03. "See My Tears"

 Curren$y - The Stoned Immaculate
04. "Take You There" (feat. Marsha Ambrosius)
10. "That's The Thing" (feat. Estelle)

 Elle Varner - Conversational Lush
05. "Runaway"

 Nas - Life is Good
 01. "No Introduction"

 Rick Ross - God Forgives, I Don't
05. "Maybach Music IV" (feat. Ne-Yo)
06. "Sixteen" (feat. André 3000)
15. "Ten Jesus Pieces"  (feat. Stalley)
16. "Triple Beam Dreams" (feat. Nas) (Deluxe Edition bonus track)

 Slaughterhouse - On the House
05. "Ya Talkin"

 DJ Khaled - Kiss the Ring
07. "Hip Hop" (feat. Scarface, Nas, and DJ Premier)

 Slaughterhouse - Welcome To: Our House
19. "The Other Side (Deluxe Edition bonus track)"

2013
 Maybach Music Group
00. "Oil Money Gang" (Rick Ross feat. Jadakiss)

 Don Trip - Help Is On The Way
04. "Break"

 2 Chainz - B.O.A.T.S. II: Me Time
11. "So We Can Live" (featuring T-Pain) (Part II)

2014

 Rick Ross - Mastermind
16. "Thug Cry" (featuring Lil Wayne)

 Carlos Ferragamo - Shades of Blue 2.5
00. "Sober Thoughts"

 GQ - Rated Oakland
11. "Rated Oakland" (produced with 8 Bars)

 Euro - July
01. "Paris Morton Music" (freestyle)

 K. Michelle - Anybody Wanna Buy A Heart?
09. "Miss You, Goodbye"

2015
Estelle – True Romance
08. "Silly Girls"

MGK - General Admission
03. "Till I Die"

Rick Ross - Black Dollar
01. "Foreclosures"
07. "Icon" (featuring Anthony Hamilton)

2016
Termanology - More Politics
03. "Looking Back" (feat. Crushboys) Co-produced by Royce Music Group

Lloyd - Tru (EP)
01. "Tru" Co-produced by Boi-1da
05. "Tru" (feat. 2 Chainz) Co-produced by Boi-1da

2017 
 Raekwon - The Wild
14. "Purple Brick Road" (feat. G-Eazy)
 Royce da 5'9" - The Bar Exam 4
21. "Stay Down"
 Rob Markman - Write to Dream
01. "I Don't Wanna Wait" (feat. Kirby Maurier)
 Wiz Khalifa - Laugh Now, Fly Later
04. "Plane 4 U"
 PnB Rock - Catch These Vibes
05. "Lovin'" (feat. A Boogie wit da Hoodie)  Co-produced by 8 Bars, Jake One, G Koop

2018 
 Trevor Jackson - Rough Drafts, Pt. 1
11. "How That Sound"
 Masspike Miles 
00. "Sober"

2019
Rick Ross - Port of Miami 2
13. "Vegas Residency"
14. "Maybach Music VI"

Drake - Care Package
16. "Paris Morton Music"

2020
4-IZE - Look Into My Ize
2. Shit On Deez Niggaz (featuring Ludacris, Mistah F.A.B., Number 2 and Headkrack)

Bizzy Crook - Dios Mio
00. Dios Mio

2021
 Nate Joël - KIDS AT HEART - EP
01. "GIFT FROM GOD"
02. "CALL ME WHEN YOU NEED ME"
03. "DAY & AGE"
04. "GUILT"
05. "RIGHT DIRECTION"

2022
Conway the Machine - God Don't Make Mistakes
09. "So Much More"

Freddie Gibbs - $oul $old $eparately
09. "Rabbit Vision"

Upcoming projects
 K-os - BLack On BLond
00. "Faith (Part 2)" feat. Drake

 Amerie - Cymatica Vol. 1
00. Untitled

 Ashley Breathe - OVERDOSE
00. "Ground Zero"

 Nipsey Hussle - "¡Hussle"
00. "New Money"

 Fabri Fibra -  Guerra E Pace 
17. "Centoquindici"

 STS9 - " Untitled New Album"
Cris Streetz (J.U.S.T.I.C.E. League artist)
 Anes (J.U.S.T.I.C.E. League artist)

Awards

2007
 Billboard - R&B hip-hop album of the year: "The Breakthrough," Mary J. Blige
 Grammy - Best R&B album "The Breakthrough," Mary J. Blige

2009
 ASCAP- 2 Pistols "She Got It"

References

External links
 Official Site
 iStandard Behind The Rhymes

2004 establishments in Florida
American hip hop record producers
Record production trios
American musical trios
Musical groups established in 2004
Musical groups from Tampa, Florida
Southern hip hop groups
Production discographies
Hip hop collectives
American songwriting teams